Ó Midhir, aka Ó Meidhir, Irish surname, now rendered Meere, Meer, Myers, Meyers.

This family have been described as "an obscure lineage associated with the Irish church ... of Drumcliff parish, one of the Gaelic learned lineages who served as a unique caste of hereditary literati and guardians of customary law and tradition."

References

 "A Note on the Uí Mhaoir of Drumcliff", Luke McInerney, The Other Clare, vol. 35 (2011)

Surnames
Irish families
Surnames of Irish origin
Irish Brehon families
Irish-language surnames
Septs of the Dál gCais